Judkins is a surname. Notable people with the surname include:

Anne Judkins (born 1964), retired female track and field athlete from New Zealand specialising in racewalking
Jeff Judkins (born 1956), retired American professional basketball player
Rafe Judkins (born 1983), contestant on the 11th season of Survivor, which took place in Guatemala
Robin Judkins ONZM, New Zealand sports administrator
Roy Judkins, American soldier
Stan Judkins (1907–1986), Australian rules footballer who played for the Richmond Football Club in the Victorian Football League 1928–1936
Stevland Hardaway Judkins (born 1950), birth name of American musician Stevie Wonder

See also
Amos Judkins House, historic house at 8 Central Avenue in Newton, Massachusetts
Judkins shogi (ジャドケンス将棋 Jadokensu shōgi "Judkins chess"), modern variant of shogi (Japanese chess)
Judkins Middle School, Pismo Beach, California